Hutzel Women's Hospital is one of the eight institutions that compose the Detroit Medical Center. The hospital itself is connected to Harper University Hospital, on the midtown Detroit campus of the Medical Center. It is the only hospital in Southeast Michigan dedicated to women's care. As Michigan’s first and only hospital for women, Hutzel Women’s Hospital has been The Destination for Women’s Care since 1868.

History 
Hutzel Women's Hospital is the second oldest hospital in the city of Detroit. It traces its lineage to the period right after the American Civil War when a group of seven women formed an association in 1868 to provide care for unwed mothers and their infants.

Throughout the late 19th century and early and mid-20th century, the hospital became known for its innovative care of women and children, including Detroit's first baby incubator, Michigan's first research laboratory devoted to the "study of women's diseases," and establishment of the nation's first "Mother's Milk Bureau" to ensure a supply of breast milk to infants of non-lactating mothers.

In 1965 the hospital was renamed Hutzel Women's Hospital in honor of Eleonore Hutzel, recognizing her 54 years of service as a student, employee, and trustee of the hospital. Since that time the hospital has seen its services grow to include orthopedics, ophthalmology, a pain clinic and sleep center.

Hutzel is home to the nation's only National Institutes of Health (NIH) Perinatology Research Branch.

Clinical services 
Hutzel Services include: High-Risk Pregnancy Care, Maternal-Fetal Medicine, Minimally Invasive Surgery, Incontinence/Urogynecology, Long-term Birth Control, Menopause and Bariatric (Weight Loss) Surgery

Hutzel "firsts" 

1898: Detroit's first infant incubator for salvaging premature babies.

1909: Michigan's first research laboratory devoted to the study of "the diseases of women."

1912: Detroit's first hospital-based social services department which ensured that the holistic view of total treatment - including follow-up - was used with all patients, regardless of their ability to pay. Establishment of the nation's first "Mother's Milk Bureau" to ensure a supply of breast milk to infants of non-lactating mothers.

1915: Establishment of the city's first hospital-based prenatal clinics.

1928: The first hospital to routinely segregate maternity patients from medical/surgical patients to prevent disease contamination.

1955: Opened the first fertility center in Detroit.

1972: The nation's first hospital to develop and use xeroradiography for the early detection of breast cancer.

1983: Began Michigan's first in vitro fertilization program.

1983: Development of the state's first reproductive genetics program.

1983: The establishment of Michigan's first hospital-based nurse midwifery program.

1984: Michigan's first successful in vitro births were born at Hutzel.

1993: Development of the world's first embryo fetoscopy procedures.

1995: The world's first successful fetal surgery to correct a right-sided diaphragmatic hernia in a fetus was performed at Hutzel.

1998: Development of infertility procedures that allow for the fertilization of the female egg with a single sperm by direct injection and then the direct re-implantation of the fertilized egg back into the female.

1999: Institution of one of the nation's first integrated programs for first trimester screening for Down syndrome and trisomy 18.

2002: The National Institute of Child Health and Human Development granted a 10-year contract to house its Perinatology Research Branch, an intramural branch of the National Institutes of Health (NIH) that conducts studies into maternal and infant health and disease, with an estimated value of $125 million over its duration.

2002: Hutzel first in US to perform the Essure procedure for women requiring permanent birth control.

2002: Hutzel Women's Hospital was granted the largest study of its kind to treat women with Polyscystic Ovarian Syndrome (PCOS) who have infertility problems.

Ranking 
Hutzel Women's Hospital is listed in The Leapfrog Group’s 2008 Top Hospital list for patient quality and safety. The Leapfrog Group rankings are based on a survey conducted at 1,220 hospitals across the country.

Famous births 
 Diana Ross - Singer

References

External links

 Detroit Medical Center
 Hutzel Women’s Hospital

Hospitals in Detroit
Teaching hospitals in Michigan
Midtown Detroit
Detroit Medical Center
Hospitals established in 1868
Tenet Healthcare
Women in Michigan
Women's hospitals